Philippe Petitcolin (born 1952) is a French businessman, and the CEO of Safran from April 2015 to December 2020.

Petitcolin was born in 1952. He earned a bachelor's degree in mathematics, followed by a degree graduate from the Centre de Perfectionnement aux Affaires (CPA) business school, now part of HEC Paris.

He was appointed as CEO of Safran in April 2015 and left the position at the end of 2020.

He has been the vice-chairman of c (ASD) (Belgium) since April 2015.

References

1952 births
Living people
People from Meuse (department)
French chief executives
Safran Group people
Nancy-Université alumni
HEC Paris alumni